Maksut Sultanuly Narikbaev  (Maqsūt Sūltanūly Närıkbaev; 9 May 1940 – 12 October 2015) was a Kazakh jurist who served as the third Chairman of the Supreme Court of Kazakhstan. Between 2004 and 2012 he served as the chairman of the Democratic Party Adilet. In 2012 he retired as the chairman and was elected an honorary chairman of the party.

Biography
Maksut Sultanuly Narikbaev was born in 1940 to a Sunni Muslim Kazakh family in Taldykorgan District of Almaty Region.  He is the son of Sultan Narikbaev.  

Between 1968 and 1978 he studied law in the Kazakh State University in Almaty. From 1987, he was employed by the State Prosecutor of Kazakhstan. He held degrees of the candidate of science and the doctor of science. Between October 1995 and June 1996 Narikbaev was the State Prosecutor of Kazakhstan, subsequently until September 2000 he was the Chairman  of the Supreme Court of Kazakhstan. 

Narikbaev died on 12 October 2015 at the age of 75 in Astana.

References

1940 births
2015 deaths
Soviet jurists
Kazakhstani jurists
Al-Farabi Kazakh National University alumni
People from Almaty Region